Bonio is a brand of dog biscuit sold in the United Kingdom. It was originally sold by Spratts Patent Ltd. of London some 75 years ago, but through various acquisitions, it is now marketed by Nestlé Purina PetCare. Bonio is produced in Aintree, Liverpool.

History
Since 1932, Bonio biscuits have been traditionally oven-baked.

References

Dog food brands
Nestlé brands